The list of ship launches in 1742 includes a chronological list of some ships launched in 1742.


References

1742
Ship launches